Moussa Hirir (born 1 March 1984) is a Djiboutian professional footballer who plays as a midfielder for the Djibouti national football team.

Career
He played from 2008 to 2009 at Société Immobilière of Djibouti. In 2009, he moved to Kartileh DjibSat and in 2014, he transferred to Guelleh Batal. He made his national debut on 13 June 2008 in the Djibouti vs Democratic Republic of the Congo match, where he scored his first goal with the national team a week later on June 22, 2008, in the return leg against Democratic Republic of the Congo.

International goals
''Scores and results list Djibouti's goal tally first.

References

External links
Eurosport profile

1984 births
Living people
Djiboutian footballers
Association football midfielders
Djibouti international footballers
Djibouti Premier League players